"Joyful" (stylized in lower case) is a song by American Christian singer and songwriter Dante Bowe, which was released on March 12, 2021, as the lead single to his second studio album, Circles. Bowe co-wrote the song with Ben Schofield. Ben Schofield handled the production of the single.

"Joyful" peaked at No. 14 on the US Hot Christian Songs chart, and at No. 3 on the Hot Gospel Songs chart. "Joyful" won the GMA Dove Award Contemporary Gospel Recorded Song of the Year at the 2021 GMA Dove Awards. It was nominated for the Grammy Award for Best Gospel Performance/Song at the 2022 Grammy Awards.

Background

On March 12, 2021, Dante Bowe released "Joyful" as the lead single to his second studio album, Circles, along with its accompanying music video. The single followed the announcement made earlier that month, stated that Circles will be slated for release on March 26, 2021. 

Dante Bowe spoke of the message behind the song, saying: "Joy is so different than happiness. While happiness is that temporary feeling created by circumstance, joy isn’t based on anything other than truth. You can be in a bad place or sad situation and still have joy: the knowing that greater things are coming and the moment you are in is not the end."

Bowe opined that "Joyful" a "completely different" single, stating that he was pushing boundaries of what he was offering his audience sonically, by giving them "something that they’d have to grow into."

Composition

Accolades

Commercial performance
"Joyful" debuted at No. 39 on the US Hot Christian Songs chart, and at No. 22 on the Hot Gospel Songs chart. Following the album's release, "Joyful" debuted on Christian Airplay at No. 36. "Joyful" peaked at No. 14 on Hot Christian Songs, No. 3 on Hot Gospel Songs, and No. 12 on the Christian Airplay chart.

"Joyful" debuted at No. 23 on the Gospel Airplay chart dated July 31, 2021, making Bowe the first artist to simultaneously rank on the Christian radio and Gospel radio charts. "Joyful" went on to reach No. 1 on the Gospel Airplay chart dated February 26, 2022, becoming Bowe's first chart-topping song on Gospel radio.

Music videos
Dante Bowe released the music video of "Joyful" via YouTube on March 12, 2021. Creedlife directed the music video. The video shows Bowe walking about in the neighborhood on a sunny day, interacting with the people in his community.

On June 7, 2021, Bethel Music published the live performance video of "Joyful" by Dante Bowe on YouTube.

Performances
On January 14, 2022, Dante Bowe performed on "Joyful" on The Tamron Hall Show following his interview with Tamron Hall.

Charts

Weekly charts

Year-end charts

Release history

References

External links
  on PraiseCharts

2021 singles
2021 songs
Dante Bowe songs
Songs written by Dante Bowe